The closing ceremony of the 2014 Commonwealth Games, was held on 3 August 2014. Entitled "All Back to Ours", it was held at the Hampden Park, the main stadium of the event, in Glasgow, Scotland.

Sequence of events
The closing ceremony took a visual theme of a music festival, with performers, tents and flags within the stadium. The ceremony began with Scottish singer Lulu welcoming the athletes of the games. Scottish band Deacon Blue performed their signature song "Dignity". During this the workers of Glasgow were recognised as they paraded along the front of the main stand at Hampden, some on foot, others in their work vehicles.	

Local band Prides performed their hit song "Messiah". As the Commonwealth Games flag was lowered and handed to the Gold Coast, Scottish folk singer Karen Matheson performed the Robert Burns song "Ae Fond Kiss".

Speeches followed, with Prince Imran telling the crowd that the games were "pure dead brilliant", a local Glaswegian term. The games were officially closed and handed over to the Gold Coast for 2018, who began their own performance with Australian singer Jessica Mauboy.

Australian singer Kylie Minogue then performed a seven-hit songs set list, while the volunteer cast told the story of "a typical Glasgow night out". Her costume was designed by Jean Paul Gaultier and headpiece designed by millinery designer Lara Jensen. The show ended with Dougie MacLean performing Caledonia with the other performers, and a performance of "Auld Lang Syne".

Music

See also
2014 Commonwealth Games opening ceremony

References

External links

 Official ceremonies page

Closing Ceremony, 2014 Commonwealth Games
Ceremonies in the United Kingdom
Commonwealth Games closing ceremonies